This is a list of monuments that are classified by the Moroccan ministry of culture around Taza.

Monuments and sites in Taza 

|}

References 

Taza
Taza